Canadian Atlantic cod (Gadus morhua), are cold water fish, which weigh  in the wild. Atlantic cod were originally found in the Atlantic Ocean, along the borders of both Canada, England, and throughout the United States. Heavy fishing in these areas, in the late 1800s and early 1900s led to a massive decline in cod population. Today, they are grown in onshore temperature controlled, seawater tanks as eggs and eventually taken to sea cages when more developed. The majority of these artificial environments found in Canada, are located in British Columbia, New Brunswick and as well as Newfoundland and Labrador. It takes about six months for the fish to hatch followed by a 2-3 year period for them to reach their maximum selling size.

Raising Atlantic cod
Almost all Atlantic cod are now produced through aquaculture, the rearing of aquatic animals for food. The raising of Atlantic cod starts with the selection of the best female stock breed. These fish are selected from previously grown market fish, located in offshore sea cages. They are selected based on weight; typically heavier fish are able to produce more eggs. The female fish are bred in onshore tank facilities and can produce 450,000 eggs per kilogram of body weight. After separating the females, the eggs are incubated in a temperature controlled tank for about 14 days until hatching. The larvae (baby cod) are then transferred to larval tanks. During this stage the larvae are fed yolk from a yolk sack for 3 to 4 days. Once the larvae have grown large enough, they are fed ground plankton. After a duration of 35 to 40 days of feeding on plankton, the larvae undergo metamorphosis and are now fully considered fish. After metamorphosis, the fish are removed from the larval tanks and put into onshore circular tanks. They remain in this stage for 6 months or until they reach  centimeters in length. At this stage, microchips are sometimes inserted into the fish to monitor growth and collect information. The fish are then taken to sea cage sites via industrial trucks and barges. In these sea cages the cod continue to grow, reaching market weight in around 24 to 36 months.

Facilities and equipment
In commercial aquaculture there are two main areas of farming: onshore facilities and offshore sea cages. In onshore facilities, there are a number of storage tanks that are key to the early development of cod and many other cold water fish. These livestock storage include incubators (where eggs are fertilized and allowed to hatch), larval tanks (slightly larger tanks where the larvae is grown), circular tanks (last stage before fish leave the onshore facility, where metamorphosis occurs), and storage tanks where the fish can be temporarily stored as they are transported from truck, to boat, to sea site. Before the fish are taken to sea cage sites, some companies insert microchips into the fish to monitor population and patterns in the fish to improve the raising for future generations. The microchips are removed once fish are ready for market. After being transported to the ocean via private company or government ships, the fish are gently poured into a sea cage.

Labor
In both onshore and offshore facilities cod require daily maintenance. In the onshore facility an estimated team of 4 or 5 laborers are required for daily tasks, which include feeding planktonic animals, regulating tank temperatures, monitoring the health of the fish, removing any sick fish, and general maintenance to the water facilities.

Inputs
Cod are fed yolk, followed by planktonic animals (ground plankton) in the larvae stage, and finally a pellet feed after leaving the onshore facility. The pellets fed to Atlantic cod are mostly grain based, which are made of fish oil, bone meal, vitamins and minerals. 

Nutritional information
Once market size is reached, Atlantic cod fish offer a bounty of nutrients including a surplus amount of complete proteins, omega-3 fatty acids, iron and B vitamins. Atlantic cod when compared to other meat have a much lower level of saturated fat, while still holding a high protein level. In comparison, 98g of chicken provides about 18g of protein (under 40%).

Benefits to Canada
Atlantic cod farming gives a direct 8000 full-time jobs in Canada and this number is growing. More jobs are becoming available due to increase in demand for fish. In 1986 Canadian Aquaculture production was valued at 35 million, by 2006 it was valued at 912 million and this pace is still growing as illustrated in figure 1. The jobs being created by this industry are also 90% located in rural, Aboriginal or small coastal cities. Just one example of this is in B.C, Kitasoo First Nation community, where aquaculture helped reduce unemployment to zero from 80 percent. Also an analysis by Indian and Northern Affairs determined that 61 First Nations could support salmon farms, 130 could develop trout farms and 123 would have access to clam, mussel and oyster farming.

Constraints
After the near extinction of natural Atlantic cod in the wild, strict laws were made to prevent fishing of any sort. This led to aquaculture. However, the fishing industry in Canada is severely limited and regulated. 73 pieces of federal and provincial legislation regulates what is exactly allowed.

Environmental sustainability
Aquaculture (fish farming) is used for all Atlantic cod production, so that the environment and natural (wild) fish species are essentially unaffected. Fish are sold without further processing, so little to none of the animal is wasted. The only environmental concern from Atlantic cod is excess nutrients produced in their feces. If left un-filtered in natural environments, these feces could lead to denitrification. However, in almost all commercial fish farms, feces are utilized (via vacuum) as liquid fertilizer, to be used for farm activities. Other beneficial environment factors are: factories are not required for further processing and feed source has minimal requirements from environment. Finally aquaculture developments need in-depth environmental review which includes Canadian Environmental Assessment Act (CEAA), to prevent harm from ocean habitats. Organic Atlantic cod is also available as an alternative product. These fish are prohibited from antibiotics, herbicides, GMOs, parasiticides and practices that minimize negative effects on the environment.

See also
Collapse of the Atlantic northwest cod fishery

Footnotes

References
 
 
 
 
 
 
 
 

Fish farming
Agriculture in Canada